Boursonne is a commune in the Oise department in northern France. The French playwright and novelist Armand Durantin died in Boursonne on 30 December 1891.

Population

See also
Communes of the Oise department

References

Communes of Oise